PXS may refer to:

The PXS suit, a NASA prototype space suit
The ticker symbol for Provexis on the London Stock Exchange
The ticker symbol for an exchange-traded fund on the Toronto Stock Exchange
PXS, an abbreviation variant for PES or Pseudoexfoliation syndrome

See also

 
 
 PX (disambiguation)